is a Japanese butterfly swimmer. At the 2012 Summer Olympics, he competed in the Men's 200 metre butterfly, finishing in 7th place overall in the heats, but finished 6th in his semifinal and did not make the final.

He married swimmer Haruka Ueda in 2014.

References

Living people
Olympic swimmers of Japan
Swimmers at the 2012 Summer Olympics
Japanese male butterfly swimmers
Medalists at the FINA World Swimming Championships (25 m)
Universiade medalists in swimming
1987 births
People from Koganei, Tokyo
Sportspeople from Tokyo Metropolis
Universiade silver medalists for Japan
Medalists at the 2009 Summer Universiade
21st-century Japanese people